Nakada (written: 中田) is a Japanese surname. Notable people with the surname include:

Asumi Nakada (born 1988), Japanese voice actress and child model
Ayu Nakada (born 1993), Japanese football player
Hiroki Nakada (born 1992), Japanese footballer
Hiroshi Nakada (born 1964), the mayor of Yokohama, Kanagawa in Japan
Juji Nakada (1870-1939), co-founder of OMS International and first bishop of Japan Holiness Church
Kenji Nakada (born 1973), former Japanese football player
Kumi Nakada (born 1965),  Japanese volleyball player
Pedro Pablo Nakada Ludeña (born 1973), Peruvian serial killer
Yohei Nakada (born 1983), former Japanese football player
Yoshinao Nakada (1923-2000), Japanese composer

See also
Nakata, using the same kanji (中田)
Naqada (disambiguation)

Japanese-language surnames